33 is the debut release by British gothic rock/indie rock band Esben and the Witch released in 2009 by themselves and features early recordings of Eumenides and future single Marching Song.

33 was recorded in Rachel Davies' bedroom; the band released the EP in 2009. It was available as a free download of their website and hand-made CD's were released at early shows and local record shops in Brighton.

Track listing
All songs written by Esben and the Witch

References

2009 debut EPs
Esben and the Witch albums